Naomi Saalfield (born 15 May 1989), known professionally as Nai Palm, is an Australian musician, best known as the vocalist, guitarist and occasional pianist for the jazz/funk band Hiatus Kaiyote.

Early life

Nai Palm was born Naomi Grace Saalfield on May 15, 1989 in Melbourne, Australia. She and her five siblings were raised by their single mother, a choreographer and painter. Saalfield was first introduced to music by her mother, playing piano and listening to soul, flamenco, and Northwest African music. Later, her brother introduced her to classic rock staples Jimi Hendrix and Led Zeppelin. When Saalfield was 11 years old her mother died of breast cancer. Saalfield was orphaned at age 13 when her father died in a house fire.

After Saalfield's mother died, she went through the foster care system, and went to live with her aunt in Mount Beauty. She also lived for a time with a family who ran a wildlife sanctuary for native animals where she developed a love and attachment to the natural world. Her aunt had an acoustic guitar, and Nai learned to harmonize with it. When Saalfield was 15 years old, she moved back to Melbourne and was homeless for a time. She started using "Nai Palm" as a professional name while working as a fire performer.

Career 

In Melbourne, Palm began a career as a solo singer/guitarist. After one gig in 2010 she was approached by bassist Paul Bender, who had seen her performance and suggested a collaboration. The following year they formed the band Hiatus Kaiyote with drummer Perrin Moss and keyboardist Simon Mavin.

In 2012 the band opened for Taylor McFerrin in Melbourne; McFerrin later featured Nai Palm on his track "The Antidote." The band released its debut album Tawk Tomahawk independently in April 2012. The second Hiatus Kaiyote album, Choose Your Weapon, was released in May 2015. The album reached high in the Australian charts and was nominated for a Grammy Award in the United States.

In 2017, Palm released her debut solo album Needle Paw, which was possibly named after a desert flower. The album features only stripped-down vocals and guitars, and includes original tracks as well as covers of songs by David Bowie, Tamia, and Jimi Hendrix. She also worked with Australian indigenous performer Jason Guwanbal Gurruwiwi on the album. Palm explained that working on a solo album gave her greater flexibility to work on her guitar sounds and the challenge of releasing a more raw and personal record. The cover art for the album, an abstract drawing of Saalfield, was done by Chilean artist Jowy Maasdamme.

In June 2018, Palm was featured on the album Scorpion by Drake, who has spoken highly of both her and Hiatus Kaiyote. She sang on a partial cover version of "More Than a Woman" by Aaliyah, which appears at the end Drake's "Is There More". On her working relationship with Drake, Palm told NME in 2021 that he started sending her stems and they worked together to create a mutual respect; "He picked up pretty quickly that I'm not going to sell his shit to buy a yacht."

The third Hiatus Kaiyote studio album, Mood Valiant, was released in June 2021. The album's title was inspired by Palm's mother, who owned two Valiant Safari station wagons, one white and one black, and would drive whichever would suit her mood for the day.

Personal life and style 

Palm is known for her personal style and adornment, and her self-created make-up style has been noted by fashion magazines. She has a facial tattoo that replicates a scar inflicted by a crow that she cared for as a child. As stated in an interview with Allure magazine, "The way that I adorn myself is an extension of who I am: my sense of spirituality, my sense of playfulness, my sense of curiosity in the world"

On October 18, 2018, Palm revealed that she had been diagnosed with breast cancer, stating that "I am riddled with anxiety while trying to practice courage and patience daily in the face of the scariest and most emotionally triggering shit I've ever had to endure." From her hospital bed while recovering from a mastectomy, she performed a cover of Curtis Mayfield's "The Makings of You" with Paul Bender that was released online. She opted out of breast reconstruction in the hope to challenge beauty standards, but had a decorative golden likeness modeled of her breast before it was removed that she plans to wear in her stage costumes. As of an interview with KCRW Berlin in 2019, she is cancer-free.

Palm is also known for traveling with her ring-neck parrot named Charlie Parker, which died in 2019. During the COVID19 Pandemic she learned the Japanese art of Kintsugi, explaining that "...with Kintsugi you decide to make it into something beautiful in a new and different way. The bit where it was broken is now the illuminated part."

Discography

Studio albums

Awards and nominations

Australian Women in Music Awards
The Australian Women in Music Awards is an annual event that celebrates outstanding women in the Australian Music Industry who have made significant and lasting contributions in their chosen field. They commenced in 2018.

! 
|-
| 2019
| Nai Palm
| Artistic Excellence Award
| 
|

Music Victoria Awards
The Music Victoria Awards, are an annual awards night celebrating Victorian music. They commenced in 2005.

! 
|-
| 2021
| Nai Palm (Hiatus Kaiyote)
| Best Musician
| 
|
|-

External links
 Hiatus Kaiyote official website
 Nai Palm official website

References

Australian soul musicians
Musicians from Melbourne
1989 births
Living people